Michael Reid is a former professional rugby league footballer who played in the 1980s. He played for the Canterbury Bulldogs in 1987 and the Newcastle Knights from 1988 to 1989.

Playing career
Reid made his first grade debut for Canterbury against North Sydney in Round 1 1987 at Belmore Oval.

In 1988, Reid joined Newcastle and played in the club's inaugural season.  Reid's final game in first grade was a 20–2 loss against Western Suburbs at Campbelltown Stadium in Round 16 1989.

Post playing
Reid became part of the training staff at Newcastle after retiring as a player.

References

External links
http://www.rugbyleagueproject.org/players/Michael_Reid/summary.html

Australian rugby league players
Canterbury-Bankstown Bulldogs players
Newcastle Knights players
Living people
Place of birth missing (living people)
Year of birth missing (living people)
Rugby league hookers